A1689B11 is an extremely old spiral galaxy located in the Abell 1689 galaxy cluster in the Virgo constellation. The disk of A1689B11 is cool and thin, yet it produced stars at thirty times the rate of the Milky Way. A1689B11 is 11 billion light years from the Earth, forming 2.6 billion years after the Big Bang. It one of the most distant known spiral galaxies .

See also
 BX442, another old and distant spiral galaxy

References

Spiral galaxies
Virgo (constellation)
Dwarf spiral galaxies